Marshall Bouldin III (September 6, 1923 – November 12, 2012) was an American portrait artist from the U.S. state of Mississippi. Examples of his Oil paintings are currently held in more than 400 private and public art collections throughout the United States.  The New York Times once praised Bouldin as "the South's foremost portrait painter." Bouldin became the first painter to be inducted into the National Portrait Artist Hall of Fame of the Portrait Society of America.

Bouldin was born in Dundee, Mississippi, a small farming community in the northwest part of Mississippi, near the Mississippi River.  He worked at his family's cotton farm until he became a professional portrait artist during the 1950s. He painted more than 800 individuals throughout his life, including such notable subjects as Speaker of the United States House of Representatives Jim Wright, Mississippi Governor William Winter, United States Senator John C. Stennis of Mississippi, Tricia Nixon Cox, Julie Nixon Eisenhower, William Faulkner, Space Shuttle Challenger crew member Ronald McNair, and United States Representative Claude Pepper of Florida.

Bouldin, a resident of Clarksdale, Mississippi, died at St. Francis Hospital in Memphis, Tennessee, on November 12, 2012, at the age of 89.

References

1923 births
2012 deaths
American portrait painters
20th-century American painters
American male painters
21st-century American painters
21st-century American male artists
Painters from Mississippi
People from Dundee, Mississippi
People from Clarksdale, Mississippi
20th-century American male artists